"Ready for Love" is a song by Australian country singer Adam Brand. The song was released in September 2009 as the second single from Brand's eighth studio album Hell of a Ride.  The song was released in the US in 2010 and peaked at number 46 on the US Hot Country Songs in November 2010. It is Brand's only US charting single.

In September 2009, Brand performed a rumba and freestyle dance routine to the song during his final performance on Dancing with the Stars (Australian season 9), in which he went on to win.

Music video
The music video was filmed on location on Sydney's northern beaches and released on 2 September 2009.

Track listing
 "Ready for Love" - 3:17

Charts

References

2009 singles
2009 songs